François Sybille (9 October 1906, Liège – 1968) was a Belgian boxer who competed in the 1924 Summer Olympics. He was eliminated in the second round of the bantamweight class after losing his fight to the upcoming bronze medalist Jean Ces.

References

External links

Profile with image
Image on boxingtreasures

1906 births
1968 deaths
Bantamweight boxers
Olympic boxers of Belgium
Boxers at the 1924 Summer Olympics
Belgian male boxers